FunnyFest Calgary Comedy Festival is an annual summer comedy festival held in Calgary, Alberta, Canada.  It was founded by Stu Hughes (stand-up comic and social entrepreneur) in 2001 and has since grown to become Western Canada's largest comedy festival. It showcases over 70 performers both local and international. FunnyFest was also the first comedy festival to be held in Calgary, Alberta. It is a non-profit organization run entirely by volunteers. FunnyFest produces approximately 125 comedy events, seminars, talent development opportunities and workshops per annum.  FunnyFest has inspired others to copy its success.

The 16th annual FunnyFest Calgary Comedy Festival runs from June 2 to June 12, 2016, using 11 venues from theatres, showrooms, hotels to pubs and offers over 11 comedy themes in 30 comedy showcases. Other FunnyFest events are the monthly comedy series, the Christmas Comedy Fest and there is a Comedy Workshop that runs 6 times per year. The FunnyFest Talent Search has talent competitions over 6 different nights to find the funniest person. Anyone with original comedy material can apply to compete.

FunnyFest is a combination of entertainment through its comedy performances throughout the year; learning via workshops on topics, such as, "Learning How to become a Stand Up Comic" and "Laughter in the Workplace": cultivating local talent through seminars & workshops; comedy industry advocacy, socializing as part of community engagement and also volunteering and fundraising collaborations on behalf of non-profits and charities. FunnyFest donates over 100K worth of value annually to financially challenged people, charities and non-profit organizations.

FunnyFest has produced over 30 comedy performers from the Alberta region.

See also
List of festivals in Calgary

References

External links
FunnyFest Calgary Comedy Festival Homepage

Comedy festivals in Canada
Festivals in Calgary
Recurring events established in 2001
Performing arts in Calgary